Rhodes Head is a prominent headland forming the extremity of McCarthy Ridge on the southeast side of Eisenhower Range, overlooking the Nansen Ice Sheet on the coast of Victoria Land. Mapped by United States Geological Survey (USGS) from surveys and U.S. Navy air photos, 1955–63. Named by Advisory Committee on Antarctic Names (US-ACAN) for Captain James C. Rhodes, United States Marine Corps Reserve (USMCR), an LC-130 aircraft commander with U.S. Navy Squadron VX-6 for several seasons to 1967.
 

Headlands of Victoria Land
Scott Coast